The Bertha M. and Marie A. Green House is a building located in southwest Portland, Oregon, listed on the National Register of Historic Places.

See also
 National Register of Historic Places listings in Southwest Portland, Oregon

References

1937 establishments in Oregon
Art Deco architecture in Oregon
Colonial Revival architecture in Oregon
Georgian Revival architecture in Oregon
Houses completed in 1937
Houses on the National Register of Historic Places in Portland, Oregon
Portland Historic Landmarks
Southwest Hills, Portland, Oregon